The I. O. Pickering House is a historic house in Olathe, Kansas, U.S.. It was built in 1878 for Isaac O. Pickering, who served as the mayor of Olathe from 1878 to 1885. It remained in the Pickering family until 1960. It has been listed on the National Register of Historic Places since December 1, 1980.

References

Houses on the National Register of Historic Places in Kansas
Italianate architecture in Kansas
Queen Anne architecture in Kansas
Houses completed in 1878
Houses in Johnson County, Kansas
1878 establishments in Kansas